Ghosting, simmering and icing are colloquial terms which describe the practice of ending all communication and contact with another person without any apparent warning or justification and ignoring any subsequent attempts to communicate. The term originated in the early 2000s, typically referring to dating and romantic relationships. In the following decade, media reported a rise in ghosting, which has been attributed to the increasing use of social media and online dating apps. The term has also expanded to refer to similar practices among friends, family members, employers and businesses.

The most common cause of ghosting in a personal relationship is to avoid emotional discomfort in a relationship. A person ghosting typically has little acknowledgment of how it will make the other person feel. Ghosting is associated with negative mental health effects on the person on the receiving end and has been described by some mental health professionals as a passive-aggressive form of emotional abuse or cruelty.

Origin of term 
The term is used in the context of online exchanges, and became popular by 2015 through many articles on high-profile celebrity relationship dissolutions, and went on to be widely used. It has been the subject of many articles and discussions on dating and relationships in various media. It was included in the Collins English Dictionary in 2015.

In the anime "Memories" (1995) the term ghosted was used by one of the characters that chased after a hologram that vanishes.  Time stamp of 14:50 in the episode "Magnetic Rose"

In popular culture 
Ghosting appears to be becoming more common. Various explanations have been suggested, but social media is often blamed, as are dating apps, polarizing politics and the relative anonymity and isolation in modern-day dating and hookup culture, which make it easier to sever contact with few social repercussions. In addition, the more commonplace the behaviour becomes, the more individuals can become desensitised to it.

In personal relationships 
People primarily ghost in relationships as a way of avoiding emotional discomfort they are having in a relationship, and are generally not thinking of how it will make the person they are ghosting feel. A survey from BuzzFeed indicated that 81% of people who ghosted did so because they "weren't into" the person they ghosted, 64% said the person they ghosted did something they disliked, and 25% stated they were angry with the person. When a relationship is online and there are few mutual social connections in the relationship, people are more inclined to ghost due to the lack of social consequences. With ghosting becoming more common many people have become desensitized to it, making them more likely to participate in ghosting. Additionally, according to psychologist Kelsey M. Latimer, people who ghost in relationships are more likely to have personality traits and behaviors that are self-centered, avoidant, and manipulative. However, ghosting could also be a sign of self-isolation seen in people with depression, suicidal tendencies, or are relapsing with an addiction. There is limited research directly on the effect of ghosting on the person on the receiving end. However, studies have indicated that ghosting is considered the most hurtful way to end a relationship in comparison to other methods such as direct confrontation. It has been shown to cause feelings of ostracism, exclusion, and rejection. Additionally, the lack of social cues along with the ambiguity in ghosting can cause a form of emotional dysregulation in which a person feels out of control. Some mental health professionals consider ghosting to be a passive-aggressive form of emotional abuse, a type of silent treatment or stonewalling behaviour, and emotional cruelty. 

In his article, "In Defense of Ghosting", Alexander Abad-Santos states: "the thing that undermines these diatribes against ghosting is that...[we] know what happened with their ghost. It just didn't work out and sometimes we just can't accept it." He continues: "[a]t the heart of it, ghosting is as clear as any other form of rejection. The reason we complain about it is that we wanted a different outcome ... which is totally understandable."

However, this argument does not account for the inherent ambiguity in ghosting—the person being ghosted does not know whether they are being rejected for something they or somebody else did, whether the person doing it is ashamed or does not know how to break up (or is scared of hurting the other's feelings). Also, the ghost may simply not want to date the victim anymore, or may have started dating someone else while keeping the ghostee as a reserve option in case a relationship does not work out with said other date, as well as they can be facing serious problems in their lives. It may become impossible to tell which it is, making it stressful and painful.

A 2018 survey determined women, regardless of generation, were much more likely to ghost than men.

In employment 
Ghosting in employment often refers to a person who interviews for a job and is led to believe there is a chance of getting the job, then no acknowledgement of the position being filled is ever conveyed to the interviewee.

The term has also been used in reference to people accepting job offers and cutting off contact with the potential employer, as well as employees leaving their jobs without any notice.

Related terms and behaviors
While "ghosting" refers to "disappearing from a special someone's life mysteriously and without explanation", numerous similar behaviors have been identified, that include various degrees of continued connection with a target. For example, "Caspering" is a "friendly alternative to ghosting. Instead of ignoring someone, you're honest about how you feel, and let them down gently before disappearing from their lives." Then there is the sentimental and positive, but also ghost-related in origin, Marleying, which is "when an ex gets in touch with you at Christmas out of nowhere". "Cloaking" is another related behavior that occurs when an online match blocks you on all apps while standing you up for a date. The term was coined by Mashable journalist Rachel Thompson after she was stood up for a date by a Hinge match and blocked on all apps.

Research 
In 2014, a YouGov survey was taken to see if Americans have ever ghosted their partner to end a relationship. In a 2014 survey, 1,000 US adults were interviewed about ghosting with results yielding that just over 10% of Americans have ghosted someone to break up with them.

See also
Coping (psychology)
Social rejection
Ostracism
Cold shoulder
Shadow banning

References 

Bullying
Group processes
Interpersonal relationships
Psychological abuse
Relationship breakup
Shunning
Social rejection